{{Infobox Election
| election_name = 1996 United States presidential election in Arkansas
| country = Arkansas
| flag_year = 1924
| type = presidential
| ongoing = no
| previous_election = 1992 United States presidential election in Arkansas
| previous_year = 1992
| next_election = 2000 United States presidential election in Arkansas
| next_year = 2000
| election_date = November 5, 1996
| image_size = x160px
| image1 = Bill Clinton.jpg
| nominee1 = Bill Clinton
| party1 = Democratic Party (United States)
| home_state1 = Arkansas
| running_mate1 = Al Gore
| electoral_vote1 = 6
| popular_vote1 = 475,171
| percentage1 = 53.74%
| image2 = Bob Dole, PCCWW photo portrait.JPG
| nominee2 = Bob Dole
| party2 = Republican Party (United States)
| home_state2 = Kansas
| running_mate2 = Jack Kemp
| electoral_vote2 = 0
| popular_vote2 = 325,416  	
| percentage2 = 36.80%
| image3 = RossPerotColor.jpg
| nominee3 = Ross Perot
| party3 = Reform Party (United States)
| home_state3 = Texas
| running_mate3 = Pat Choate
| electoral_vote3 = 0
| popular_vote3 = 69,884  	
| percentage3 = 7.90%
| map_image = Arkansas Presidential Election Results 1996.svg
| map_size = 300px
| map_caption = County Results

ClintonDole| title = President
| before_election = Bill Clinton
| before_party = Democratic Party (United States)
| after_election = Bill Clinton
| after_party = Democratic Party (United States)
}}

The 1996 United States presidential election in Arkansas''' took place on November 5, 1996, as part of the 1996 United States presidential election. State voters chose six electors to the Electoral College, who voted for president and vice president.

Arkansas was won by President Bill Clinton (D-AR) by a 17% margin of victory.

The presidential election in the Natural State was a critical victory for the Democratic ticket, because Arkansas was Clinton's home state. Dole did not put up a challenge in Arkansas, and neither did billionaire businessman Ross Perot (Ref-TX), who had unsuccessfully run for president as an independent in the previous election. Perot in 1996 won 7.90 percent of the popular vote in the Natural State, a significant total for a third party candidate.

, this remains the last time that a Democratic presidential nominee has carried Arkansas. The state has swung rapidly towards the Republican Party in each subsequent election, transforming from a Democratic stronghold into one of the most staunchly Republican states in the nation. This is also the last election in which Washington County, Columbia County, Arkansas County, Faulkner County, Union County, Garland County, Johnson County, Howard County, Calhoun County, Saline County, Perry County, Miller County, Van Buren County, Montgomery County, Madison County, Pike County, Logan County, White County, Lonoke County, Pope County, Independence County, Cleburne County, Yell County, Conway County, Franklin County, Grant County, Sharp County, Sevier County, Marion County, Stone County, Fulton County, Scott County, Prairie County, and Cleveland County voted for a Democratic presidential candidate.

Results

Results by county

See also
 United States presidential elections in Arkansas
 Presidency of Bill Clinton

References

1996 Arkansas elections
Arkansas
1996